The 2015 Surrey Heath Borough Council election took place on 7 May 2015 to elect all members of Surrey Heath Borough Council in England as one of the 2015 local elections, held simultaneously with the General Election.

Results

The results saw these net changes:

Ward by ward

References

2015 English local elections
May 2015 events in the United Kingdom
2015
2010s in Surrey